(born February 19, 1960) is a retired female high jumper from Japan. She competed for her native country at the 1984 Summer Olympics in Los Angeles, California, finishing in 17th place in the final rankings with a jump of 1.87 m. She earlier won the gold medal at the 1981 Asian Championships in Tokyo, in a new Asian record of 1.93 m. She was a three-time Japanese Championships champion (1980, 1982 and 1984).

See also
List of Asian Games medalists in athletics

References
 sports-reference

1960 births
Living people
Sportspeople from Saga Prefecture
Japanese female high jumpers
Olympic athletes of Japan
Athletes (track and field) at the 1984 Summer Olympics
Asian Games silver medalists for Japan
Asian Games medalists in athletics (track and field)
Athletes (track and field) at the 1982 Asian Games
Medalists at the 1982 Asian Games
World Athletics Championships athletes for Japan
Asian Athletics Championships winners
Japan Championships in Athletics winners
20th-century Japanese women
21st-century Japanese women